Słupowiec  is a village in the administrative district of Gmina Kcynia, within Nakło County, Kuyavian-Pomeranian Voivodeship, in north-central Poland.

The village has a population of 50.

References

Villages in Nakło County